Vasily Pavlovich Solovyov-Sedoi (– 2 December 1979) was a Soviet classical composer and songwriter who was born and died in Leningrad.

Solovyov-Sedoi composed the music for many songs such as "Moscow Nights" and "Nightingales". He also wrote music for numerous films. Originally named Solovyov, when he entered the Union of Soviet Composers he added the suffix "Sedoi", meaning grey-haired, to avoid confusion with another composer with the same surname.

Filmography 
 Heavenly Slug (1945)
 The First Glove (1946)
 World Champion (1954)
 Good Morning (1955)
 Maksim Perepelitsa (1955)
 Be Careful, Grandma! (1960)
 Don Tale (1964)
 The Salvos of the Aurora Cruiser (1965)
 Virineya (1968)
 Fitil (1975)
 Sweet Woman (1976)
 A Taiga Story (1979)

References

External links
  Short biography

1907 births
1979 deaths
20th-century classical composers
20th-century classical pianists
20th-century Russian male musicians
Musicians from Saint Petersburg
Saint Petersburg Conservatory alumni
Third convocation members of the Supreme Soviet of the Soviet Union
Fourth convocation members of the Supreme Soviet of the Soviet Union
Fifth convocation members of the Supreme Soviet of the Soviet Union
Heroes of Socialist Labour
People's Artists of the RSFSR
People's Artists of the USSR
Stalin Prize winners
Lenin Prize winners
Recipients of the Order of Lenin

Recipients of the Order of the Red Star
Solovyov-Sedoi, Vasily
Russian classical pianists
Russian film score composers
Russian male classical composers
Soviet classical pianists
Soviet film score composers
Soviet male classical composers